The Athletics at the 2016 Summer Paralympics – Men's 1500 metres T54 event at the 2016 Paralympic Games took place on 12–13 September 2016, at the Estádio Olímpico João Havelange.

Heats

Heat 1 
18:48 12 September 2016:

Heat 2 
18:56 12 September 2016:

Heat 3 
19:04 12 September 2016:

Final 
18:22 13 September 2016:

Notes

Athletics at the 2016 Summer Paralympics
2016 in men's athletics